The Shenzhen–Shanwei high-speed railway is a high-speed railway currently under construction in Guangdong, China. It is expected to open in 2025.

This railway, combined with the Guangzhou–Shanwei high-speed railway between Shenshan and Shanwei, will provide a faster route between Shanwei and Shenzhen Pingshan than the existing Xiamen–Shenzhen railway. West of Shenzhen Pingshan, it will take a new route into Shenzhen with a new intermediate station, Luohu North, before terminating at Xili railway station.

History
Construction began on 4 January 2021.

Stations

References

High-speed railway lines in China
High-speed railway lines under construction